Haynesworth is a surname. Notable people with the surname include:

Albert Haynesworth (born 1981), American football player
Thomas Haynesworth (born 1965), African-American convict

See also
Haynsworth